Reinhard Kolldehoff (29 April 1914 – 18 November 1995) was a German film actor. He appeared in 140 films between 1941 and 1988. He was born and died in Berlin, Germany.

Selected filmography

 The Gasman (1941) - Polizeibeamter (uncredited)
 Blum Affair (1949) - Max Tischbein - Lehrer
 Das Mädchen Christine (1949) - 1.Leutnant
 Quartet of Five (1949) - Patient
 Martina (1949)
 Rotation (1949) - Rudi Wille
 Unser täglich Brot (1949)
 Hoegler's Mission (1950) - Fichte
 Bürgermeister Anna (1950) - Jupp Ucker
 The Orplid Mystery (1950) - Funker
 Melody of Fate (1950)
 A Tale of Five Cities (1951) - Nazi (uncredited)
 The Last Year (1951) - Kommissar
 Turtledove General Delivery (1952)
  (1952) - Hartner (segment "Je suis un tendre")
 I Lost My Heart in Heidelberg (1952) - Kapitän Reimann
 The Merry Vineyard (1952) - Küfer
 When the Heath Dreams at Night (1952)
 We'll Talk About Love Later (1953)
 Knall and Fall as Detectives (1953)
 The Man Between (1953) - Eastern German Police Officer commanding the hunt for Ivo Kern and Susanne Mallison (uncredited)
 Christina (1953) - Kavalier
 Weg ohne Umkehr (1953)
 Father Is Being Stupid (1953)
 Gitarren der Liebe (1954)
 Unternehmen Edelweiß (1954) - Erich
 Stopover in Orly (1955) - Joseph
 The Star of Rio (1955) - Torres
 Sergeant Borck (1955) - Spediteur Süßkind
 Hanussen (1955) - Biberger
 Urlaub auf Ehrenwort (1955) - Otto Sasse
 The Missing Scientists (1955) - Kolchak
 The Girl from Flanders (1956) - 1. Revolutionär / Simon's Henchmen
 The Captain from Köpenick (1956) - Drunken soldier
 The Story of Anastasia (1956) - Fichte
 Liane, Jungle Goddess (1956) - Keller
 Kalle wird Bürgermeister (1957)
 Tired Theodore (1957) - Hotelgast
 Das haut hin (1957) - Kuhlmann, Zirkusangestellter
 Das Glück liegt auf der Straße (1957)
 The Fox of Paris (1957) - Werner Biener, SD-Beamter
 The Copper (1958) - Willy
 Les aventuriers du Mékong (1958) - Gunther
 Confess, Doctor Corda (Gestehen Sie, Dr. Corda, 1958) - Kriminalbeamter
 Hoppla, jetzt kommt Eddie (1958) - Assistant of the Hotelier
 Liebe kann wie Gift sein (1958) - Achill
 Romarei, das Mädchen mit den grünen Augen (1958) - Funker Blessing
 Cigarettes, Whiskey and Wild Women (1959)
 Stalingrad: Dogs, Do You Want to Live Forever? (1959)
 Court Martial (Kriegsgericht, 1959) - Feldwebel
  (1959)
 And That on Monday Morning (Und das am Montagmorgen, 1959) - Herr Müller
 Bobby Dodd greift ein (1959)
 Der Frosch mit der Maske (1959) - Lew Brady
 La verte moisson (1959)
 Orientalische Nächte (1960) - Jemzeff
 Le 7eme jour de Saint-Malo (1960) - Von Sullock - le commandant allemand du camp
 The Thousand Eyes of Dr. Mabuse (Die 1000 Augen des Dr. Mabuse, 1960) - Roberto Menil alias 'Klumpfuß'
 The Secret Ways (1961) - The Count's man
 Vacances en enfer (1961)
 The Strange Countess (Die seltsame Gräfin, 1961) - Kriminalassistent Oliver Frank aka Butler John Addams
  (1961)
 Das Mädchen und der Staatsanwalt (1962)
 The Counterfeit Traitor (1962) - Col. Erdmann (uncredited)
 Murder in Rio (1963) - Harry
 Bergwind (1963) - Mr. Wright
 Bob Morane (1964, TV Series) - Ricardo Ruiz
 Le Chant du monde (1965) - Mandru
 Anónima de asesinos (1966) - Nick Collins
 Line of Demarcation (La Ligne de démarcation, 1966) - Major von Pritsch
 To Skin a Spy (1966) - Hoffman (uncredited)
 Martin Soldat (1966) - Le chef de la Gestapo
 Le Saint prend l'affût (1966) - Schmutz (uncredited)
 La Grande Vadrouille (1966) - Un caporal allemand
 Play Time (1967) - German Businessman
 Street Acquaintances of St. Pauli (1968) - Radebach
 Le franciscain de Bourges (1968) - Basedow
  (Die Ratten, 1969, TV film) - Herr John
 The Damned (La caduta degli dei, 1969) - Baron Konstantin von Essenbeck
 La Horse (1970) - Hans
 Heintje - Mein bester Freund (1970) - Herr Kleinschmidt
 Atlantic Wall (1970) - Heinrich
  (1970, TV Movie) - Klauss
 The Seven Headed Lion (1970) - Governor
 Havoc (Das Unheil, 1972) - Pfarrer
 Shadows Unseen (Abuso di potere, 1972) - Chief of Police
 A Time for Loving (1972) - Oberleutnant
 The Revengers (1972) - Zweig
 The Master Touch (Un uomo da rispettare, 1972) - Detective Hoffman
 ... All the Way, Boys! (...più forte ragazzi!, 1972) - Mr. Ears
 A Reason to Live, a Reason to Die (Una ragione per vivere e una per morire, 1972) - Sergente Brent
 Galaxie (1972) - Winkler
 Revolver (1973) - French Lawyer
 L'ironie du sort (1974) - Helmut
 Borsalino & Co. (1974) - Sam
 The Romantic Englishwoman (1975) - Herman
 Operation Daybreak (1975) - Fleischer, Gestapo
 Je t'aime moi non plus (1976) - Boris
 Shout at the Devil (1976) - Herman Fleischer, German Commissioner / Military Commander of Southern Province
 Boomerang (1976) - Le banquier Feldman
 Derrick: Der Mann aus Portofino (1976, TV series episode) - Herr Kremp
 Shir Khofteh (1976)
  (1977) - Flugkapitän
  (1977)
 Julie pot-de-colle (1977) - Heinzel
 Es muss nicht immer Kaviar sein (1977, TV Series) - Schallenberg
 Soldier of Orange (Soldaat van Oranje, 1977) - Geisman
 The Rider on the White Horse (1978) - Jess Harders
 Lo chiamavano Bulldozer (1978) - Colonel Martin
 Just a Gigolo (1978) - Max, Cillys Agent
 Primel macht ihr Haus verrückt (1980) - Herr Kulicke
 The Rebel (Poliziotto solitudine e rabbia, 1980) - Stoll
 The Formula (1980) - Reimeck
 Kenn' ich, weiß ich, war ich schon! (1981)
  (1981, TV Movie) - von Hermsdorf
 The Winds of War (1983, TV Mini-Series) - Hermann Göring
 Julie Darling (1983) - Lt. Rossmore
 Équateur (1983) - Eugene Schneider
 Man Under Suspicion (Morgen in Alabama, 1984) - Politician
 The Little Drummer Girl (1984) - Inspector
  (1985) - Ferenczy
 High Speed (1986) - Le trafiquant
 Werther (1986)
 Moon over Parador (1988) - Gunther

References

External links

1914 births
1995 deaths
German male film actors
German male television actors
Male actors from Berlin
20th-century German male actors